The greater thornbird (Phacellodomus ruber) is a species of bird in the family Furnariidae. It is found in Argentina, Bolivia, Brazil, Paraguay, and Uruguay. Its natural habitats are subtropical or tropical moist shrubland, riparian thickets, and secondary growths.

Description
The sexes are similar, the upper parts being brown, with a rather more rufous colour on the crown, wings and tail. The underparts are whitish, the neck sometimes being scaled with a darker colour. The iris is yellow and any superciliary streak is inconspicuous. This thornbird is the largest member of the genus; the freckle-breasted thornbird (Phacellodomus striaticollis), though smaller, can look very similar, but is usually a more even shade of brown above with less rufous colouring. The song is a series of loud "chip" notes that gradually become faster but quieter.

Distribution and habitat
The species is native to tropical and subtropical South America. Its range extends from northern Bolivia and central Brazil southwards to Paraguay, northern Argentina and northeastern Uruguay. It typically inhabits areas of undergrowth in lowland gallery woodland, shrubs and scrub, seldom being found far from water.

Ecology
This thornbird tends to skulk in the undergrowth and usually occurs in pairs. However it does utter its song frequently, emerging to perch in a more open position to do this. The pair sometimes sing in duet. It feeds mainly on insects such as beetles and ants. It is often built in a position overhanging water, or is sometimes attached to a telegraph pole or other man-made object. 
Breeding takes place between October and January.

Status
The greater thornbird is a common species with a very wide range. No particular threats have been recognised and the population is thought to be stable, so the International Union for Conservation of Nature has rated its conservation status as being of "least concern".

References

External links

 Image at ADW

greater thornbird
Birds of Argentina
Birds of Bolivia
Birds of the Cerrado
Birds of the Pantanal
Birds of Paraguay
greater thornbird
Taxa named by Louis Jean Pierre Vieillot
Taxonomy articles created by Polbot